In white supremacist circles, a ghost skin (short for 'ghost skinhead') is a white supremacist who refrains from openly displaying their racist beliefs for the purpose of blending into wider society and surreptitiously furthering their agenda. The term has been used in particular to refer to the entryism of racist activists in law enforcement. The term "hiding your power levels", originating from the anime Dragon Ball Z, is alternatively used by the alt-right to reflect a similar concept.

History of the term 
In an FBI Intelligence Assessment from 2006, the FBI Counterterrorism Division provided an overview of white supremacist infiltration of law enforcement and mentions that use of the term came to the agency's attention in late 2004. In 2001, two law enforcement officers in Williamson County, Texas, were fired after it was discovered that they were members of the Ku Klux Klan.

According to the Oregon National Socialist Movement website, explicitly cited by the 2006 FBI report, "Ghost Skins don't shave their heads, wear boots, braces or anything else that can visually identify them as Nazis. [They] strive to blend into society to be unreconizable [sic] by the jewish [sic] enemy. When it serves [their] purposes [they] gladly act politically correct. [They] are at war and [they] use the weapon of deception to deny the enemy intelligence they could use against [them]."

On September 29, 2020, Jamie Raskin, the Chairman of the Subcommittee on Civil Rights and Civil Liberties, released an unredacted version of an FBI report called White Supremacist Infiltration of Law Enforcement.

See also
Crypto-fascism
Identity Evropa
Identitarian movement
Lynwood Vikings
Right-wing terrorism

References

Further reading

 

Alt-right
Counterterrorism
Deception
Identitarian movement
Neo-Nazi concepts
Politics and race
Secrecy
White supremacy
2000s neologisms
2004 neologisms